June R. Grube Robinson (born June 27, 1959) is an American  Democratic Party politician. She is a member of the Washington State Senate, representing the 38th Legislative District. Robinson was appointed to the Washington House of Representatives by the Snohomish County Council on December 16, 2013 to fill the vacancy left after John McCoy was appointed to the Washington State Senate. In 2012, she fell about 5.5 points short of being elected to an open seat on Everett City Council following the death of Everett City Councilman Drew Nielsen.

Robinson was appointed to the Washington State Senate to fill a vacancy left after McCoy's retirement in 2020.

References

1959 births
Living people
Democratic Party Washington (state) state senators
University of Michigan School of Public Health alumni
University of Delaware alumni
Women state legislators in Washington (state)
Politicians from Everett, Washington
21st-century American politicians
21st-century American women politicians
Democratic Party members of the Washington House of Representatives